Raman Higher Secondary School was one of the oldest schools in Bhopal. This school was established in 1963 by Bharat Heavy Electrical Education Society (now part of BHEL Shiksha Mandal Bhopal, with funding from the public sector engineering company Bharat Heavy Electricals Limited (BHEL) Bhopal.

Etymology
The school was named after C. V. Raman, an Indian scientist who was awarded the 1930 Nobel Prize in Physics for his work on the scattering of light and for the discovery of the Raman effect.

History
Established in 1963, the school has witnessed an array of changes and modifications. At first the school was run in a TRT Camps as Raman Middle School (Govindpura) - TRT(Temporary Residential Tenements) Camps were built to facilitate the labours and workers of (NBCC) (National Building construction corporation) involved in construction of the houses. The new (existing) building for the school was later built, spread over  land, and the higher secondary section shifted there. It was named Raman Middle School (later renamed to Bhabha Middle school - TRT Campus) with primary and middle school classes. 

In 2002 Bhabha middle school was closed and the entire school was consolidated in one building. In 2007 N. U. K. Menon succeeded former principal A. N. Mishra on the latter's retirement and remained for one year. In the 2008-09 session the school was closed by BHEL Shiksha Mandal Bhopal, citing absence of students.

Campus
The school had the following structures:

The double-storeyed main building, along with the annexe. 
Teachers' block.
A large playing field.

Students
The school was a Co-education school. Students of this school found place in the merit list of Board of Secondary Education, Madhya Pradesh. They got selections in the topmost medical and engineering institutes of India. Students always feel proud to be a part of such a good school.

Extra curricular activities
The school offered students an extensive array of extra curricular opportunities, such as the creative arts and a wide range of sport.

Sports
Besides the annual sports events, the school had regular cricket team that participates in inter-school championships. This school had produced some of the finest athletes in Bhopal.

Ceremonies
The Independence day (15 August) is a great annual ceremony. They had their own Annual function in which students perform and also receive awards for their best performance in studies as well as in extra-curricular activities.

Curriculum
This school was a higher secondary school (from class 1 to 12). The curriculum was governed by the Board of Secondary Education, Madhya Pradesh. It was the only Board school of Bhopal having ISO certification.

References

External links
 BHEL Shiksha Mandal

Schools in Bhopal
Educational institutions established in 1972